Marco Medici, O.P. (died 1583) was a Roman Catholic prelate who served as Bishop of Chioggia (1578–1583).

Biography
Marco Medici was ordained a priest in the Order of Preachers.
On 15 December 1578, he was appointed during the papacy of Pope Gregory XIII as Bishop of Chioggia.
He served as Bishop of Chioggia until his death on 30 August 1583.

References

External links and additional sources
 (for Chronology of Bishops) 
 (for Chronology of Bishops) 

16th-century Italian Roman Catholic bishops
Bishops appointed by Pope Gregory XIII
1583 deaths
Dominican bishops